Idu (also Romanized as Īdū) is a village in Kakhk Rural District, Kakhk District, Gonabad County, Razavi Khorasan Province, Iran. At the 2006 census, its population was 64, in 23 families.

References 

Populated places in Gonabad County